Örebro is the sixth-largest city in Sweden, the seat of Örebro Municipality, and capital of the Örebro County. It is situated by the Närke Plain, near the lake Hjälmaren, a few kilometers inland along the small river Svartån, and has a population of approximately 126,000 in the city proper. It is one of the largest inland hubs of the country, and a major logistic and commercial operating site.

Örebro is home to Örebro University, a major university hospital, a medieval castle, the water park Gustavsvik as well as several large shopping malls and the Oset-Rynningeviken nature reserve at the lakefront.

Örebro is served by Örebro Airport 10 km (6 mi) southwest of the city, and by Örebro Central Station, serviced by the Mälaren Line and Western Main Line.

Etymology 
The name Örebro refers to a bridge crossing the river Svartån where the city is located. The prefix  is derived from  'gravel (bank)'.

History

Örebro received its Royal Charter and city privileges not later than 1404.

The location became a natural seat of commerce in the Scandinavian Middle Ages and is mentioned in print in the 13th century. Old buildings from the early days include the foundations of the city church, a building which has undergone several modifications. The natural center of the city is otherwise Örebro Castle, situated on an islet in the Svartån, and dividing the town into a northern and a southern part. This castle was constructed during the stewardship of Birger Jarl during the late 13th century and then modified and enlarged during the reign of King Gustav Vasa in the 1560s. The Örebro Synod was held here in 1529.

Notable events in Örebro's history include the national diet meeting at Örebro in 1810, where Jean-Baptiste Bernadotte was elected crown prince of Sweden.

Although a trade town, Örebro remained small until the second half of the 19th century, when it grew rapidly as a center of the national shoe-manufacturing industry.

Climate

Örebro, like the rest of the area close to Mälardalen, has a humid continental climate (Köppen Dfb) that is made milder by the proximity to water and the Gulf Stream which makes it interchangeable with oceanic climates. Summer temperatures occasionally exceed  albeit not yearly, and temperatures above  are rare in winter, although frost-free nights sometimes occur. During cold winters, Örebro receives plenty of snowfall. Örebro is far more prone than coastal areas to really harsh frosts with temperatures approaching or below  happening almost every winter according to SMHI statistics. The station's setting in a rural location might skew temperatures somewhat compared to the urban area which is also at a slightly lower elevation and nearer Hjälmaren. Especially when considering overnight lows this could render a small urban heat island effect in the city centre.

However, the climate is very variable from year to year.

During the 21st century, the record heat is  set on 8 August 2018. Several monthly records were set in the 2010s according to official SMHI statistics, namely the record highs of March, May, July, October and December as well as the coldest December temperature and month on record, that was set in 2010. Humidity is high for most parts of the year, but adequately lower during summer months. In spite of this summer is generally the time that gets the most precipitation due to clashes between hot and cool continental air systems causing heavy thunderstorm rainfall. In 2015, a  reading was recorded around the winter solstice which was a very warm reading for an inland area in the low-sun season.

Demography

Population development Örebro County

Population development Örebro Municipality

Sites of interest

Örebro's old town, Wadköping, is located on the banks of the Svartån (black stream). It contains many 18th and 19th century wooden houses, along with museums and exhibitions.
The water tower of Örebro, named Svampen (The Mushroom), is a popular destination as an outlook tower. In 1971, a replica of the tower was built in Riyadh, Saudi Arabia.

Culture
 Swedish Chamber Orchestra
 Örebro is the hometown of the punk-rock band Millencolin. They named one of their albums Pennybridge Pioneers, where Pennybridge stands for Örebro as a colloquial translation into English.
 Örebro is the hometown of various Swedish rock bands, such as Smash Into Pieces, Truckfighters, Blues Pills, Witchcraft, Troubled Horse and others, Graveyard's Lead Singer, Joakim Nilsson also was born in Örebro
 The influential and highly popular grind band Nasum were formed in Örebro.
 Örebro is one of the public broadcaster SVT's 12 local news districts and has television premises located in the city.

Örebro has hosted a contemporary art exhibition called Open Art on four occasions: in 2008, 2009, 2011 and 2013. In 2013, the exhibition featured works by 90 artists from Sweden and many other countries throughout the world. The fifth edition of the exhibition is planned for the summer of 2015.

Örebro University is one of Sweden's most recent, being upgraded from högskola (university college) in 1999. It currently has around 16,000 students and a staff of 1,100. The institution is regarded as one of the top 351–400 universities in the world. The university is also named among the world's top 100 young universities (number 62) in the 2018 THE Young University Rankings.

Gustavsvik, the largest water park in the Nordic countries, is located just a kilometer south of central Örebro. With more than 700,000 visitors per year, it is one of the most popular tourist and leisure establishments in Sweden. Only Liseberg, Gröna Lund and Skansen are more popular. In the summer the manor of Karlslund is a very popular place to visit.

Gallery

Sports

Football
 Örebro SK currently playing in Superettan.
 Karlslunds IF currently play in Division 1 Norra.
 BK Forward currently playing in Division 2 Norra Svealand.
 Örebro Nordic currently playing in Division 4 Örebro.
 Rynninge IK currently play in Division 2 Södra Svealand.
 Örebro Syrianska IF currently play in Division 2 Södra Svealand.
 FK Bosna 92 currently play in Division 3 Västra Svealand.
 Adolfsbergs IK currently play in Division 4 Örebro.
 IFK Örebro currently play in Division 4 Örebro.
 IK Sturehov currently play in Division 4 Örebro.
 Axbergs IF currently play in Swedish football Division 6 Norra.

Floorball
 Lillån IBK
 IBF Örebro

Other sports
 Örebro Volley play in the highest level of women's volleyball leagues in Sweden. They have won the league ten times.
 Örebro HK currently play in Swedish Hockey League (the highest level) since the 2013–14 season, having been promoted in the 2012–13 season.
 Örebro Black Knights are an American football Club that played in the Swedish Championship Finals in 1998, 1999, 2013, 2014, 2015, 2016 and 2017.
 Örebro Universitets IF Rugby
 Örebro SK Bandy has become national bandy champion five times. The home matches are played in Behrn Arena, one of sixteen (as of 2018) indoor bandy arenas in Sweden.

Karlslunds IF is a multi-sports club specialising in American Football, Bandy, Baseball/Softball, Bowling, Football, Gymnastics, Skiing and Swimming.

Notable people

Artists
Stephan Berg (born 1957), composer and songwriter, winner of Eurovision Song Contest 1991
Jens Bogren (born 1979), record producer
Ola Brunkert (1946–2008), drummer in ABBA
Josef Fares (born 1977), Lebanese-Swedish film director
Jasmine Kara (born 1988), singer
Rob Marcello (born 1977), guitar player
Nina Persson (born 1974), singer
Mats Ronander (born 1954), singer, guitar player, and composer
Mary Stävin (born 1957), James Bond girl, crowned as Miss World 1977
Dan Swanö (born 1973), singer and multi-instrumentalist

Bands
Blues Pills (2011–present), rock band
Dead Man (2003–present), psychedelic folk rock band
Lolita Pop (1979–1992), rock band
Millencolin (1992–present), punk rock band
Nasum (1992–present), grindcore band
Spetsnaz (2001–present), electronic band
Truckfighters (2001–present), rock band
Witchcraft (2000–present), doom metal band

Politicians and public officials
Henry Allard (1911–1996), politician
Leni Björklund (born 1944), politician
Engelbrekt Engelbrektsson, (1390s–1436), rebel leader and statesman
Sten Tolgfors (born 1966), politician and businessman
Olof Daniel Westling (Prince Daniel; born 1973), husband of Crown Princess Victoria

Religion
Gunnel André (born 1946), theologian, minister and author
John Ongman (1844–1931), pastor
Laurentius Petri (1499–1573), clergyman
Olaus Petri (1493–1552), clergyman and reformer

Scientists and engineers
Jens Bergensten (born 1979), game developer and lead designer of Minecraft
Bertil Lindblad (1895–1965), astronomer
Manne Siegbahn (1886–1978), physicist
Gunnar A. Sjögren (1920–1996), automobile designer
Jonas Wenström (1855–1893), engineer and inventor

Sportspeople
Peter Andersson (born 1965), ice hockey player
Christian Berglund (born 1980), ice hockey player
Orvar Bergmark (1930–2004), football and bandy player
Stig Blomqvist (born 1946), rally driver
Hasse Borg (born 1953), football player
Elisabeth Branäs (1930–2010), curler, two-time European champion
Philip Broberg (born 2001), ice hockey player
Magnus Erlingmark (born 1968), football player
Emilia Fahlin (born 1988), cyclist
Richard Göransson (born 1978), racing driver
Carl Gunnarsson (born 1986), ice hockey player
Oscar Jansson (born 1990), football player
Fredrik Lindgren (born 1985), motorcycle speedway rider
Ludvig Lindgren (born 1990), motorcycle speedway rider
Tomas Nordahl (born 1946), football player and commentator
Ronnie Peterson (1944–1978), racing driver
Johan Röjler (born 1981), ice speed skater
Emra Tahirović (born 1987), Bosnian-Swedish football player
Borje Jansson (born 1942), Motorcycle rider, winner of four  World Championship GPs, three in   125cc Class, one in 250cc Class.

Writers
Hjalmar Bergman (1883–1931), writer and playwright
August Gailit (1891–1960), Estonian writer
Edita Morris (1902–1988), Swedish-American writer and political activist
Emilie Risberg (1815–1890), novelist and educator
Cajsa Warg (1703–1769), cookbook author

Twin towns – sister cities

Örebro is twinned with:

 Drammen, Norway
 Kolding, Denmark
 Lappeenranta, Finland
 Łódź, Poland

 Stykkishólmur, Iceland
 Terrassa, Spain
 Veliky Novgorod, Russia
 Yantai, China

See also
Brickebacken
Olaus Petriskolan, a school in Örebro

References

External links

 
County seats in Sweden
Populated places in Örebro Municipality
Municipal seats of Örebro County
Swedish municipal seats
Cities in Örebro County